Lizard Point, Queensland is a rocky outcrop between Mount Steamer and Mount Roberts. It offers great panoramic views of the Main Range National Park, Boonah and other Scenic Rim areas.

Headlands of Queensland
Main Range National Park